Hebron High School (HHS) is one of five public high schools in the Lewisville Independent School District and is located in Carrollton, Texas. The school opened in 1999 and was the fourth high school to do so in its district. It services communities from far west Plano, southwest Frisco, small portions of far east The Colony, far north Carrollton, and far southeast Lewisville. Hebron serves grades ten through twelve; ninth graders attend the adjacent Hebron High School 9th Grade Campus. In 2015, the school was rated “Met Standard” by the Texas Education Agency. Hebron is currently classified as a 6A school by the University Interscholastic League.

History
On April 10, 1997, ground was broken on the second of two new high schools in the Lewisville Independent School District. Situated on 70 acres of land, the school was intended to allow students from north Carrollton to avoid the commute to The Colony High School and Marcus High School. While the school was intended to be named the "North Carrollton High School," potential confusion between it and another school in construction - Carrollton-Farmers Branch Independent School District's planned "Carrollton North High School" - led to the renaming of both schools. While the names "East Side High School" and "West View High School" were considered by Lewisville ISD as replacements, the name "Hebron High School" was ultimately selected in reference to a school of the same name which was built in the same area during the late 19th century.

Hebron was the fourth high school opened by Lewisville ISD, totaling $23 million in preliminary construction costs alone. Hebron was constructed in five phases, with the first three fulfilling the school's immediate student-enrollment needs; construction of the first three phases was completed in June 1998. The fourth and fifth phases included classroom additions and an 800-seat auditorium and were completed after the school's opening. Hebron High School was originally located in the town of Hebron, but its land has since been incorporated into Carrollton.

When Hebron was being built, Lewisville ISD asked students of Arbor Creek Middle School to submit ideas for the mascot and student body nickname of the future school. Suggestions included the “Hawks,” the “Hippos,” and the “Hurricanes”; ultimately, it was decided that the “Hawks” best fit the school. Although the school's colors are black, silver, and royal blue, the school was constructed before this was decided; as such, the interior of the school follows an unrelated yellow and green color scheme.

The school opened in 1999, originally only serving two grade levels and 498 students; eventually, the school would expand to serve grades nine through twelve. In 2010, the Hebron High School 9th Grade Campus was opened adjacent to the main campus to relieve stress caused by a growing student body.

Feeder Schools

Elementary schools that feed into Hebron include:
 Castle Hills Elementary School
 Coyote Ridge Elementary School
 Hebron Valley Elementary School
 Homestead Elementary School
 Hicks Elementary School
 Indian Creek Elementary School
 Polser Elementary School
 Independence Elementary School

Middle schools that feed into Hebron include:
 Killian Middle School 
 Arbor Creek Middle School
 Creek Valley Middle School

Students from other schools and districts are able to enroll here.

Academics
In 2015, Hebron High School was rated "Met Standard" by the Texas Education Agency. Hebron has a graduation rate of 98.9% and a drop rate of 0.4%. As of the 2018-2019 school year, HHS serves 133 Bilingual/ESL students, 350 students in the Gifted and Talented (GT) Program, and 240 students through special education services. HHS also participates in the Advanced Placement Program. 46% of students take at least one AP Exam, with a passing rate of 81.8%.

Yearly, dozens of Hebron students are named National Merit commended students - several of whom advance to Semi-Finalist and Finalist status.

Hebron High School students are able to acquire career and technical education (CTE) at two different career centers, Dale Jackson Career Center and Technology, Exploration & Career Center EAST (TECC-E). These two secondary campuses for high school students opened in 2010 to accommodate Lewisville ISD's growing CTE student population.

On the 2016 STAAR, the following scores for all grades show the percentage achieving at Approaches Grade Level or above:
 English II - 81% (State 73% and District 82%)
 U.S. History - 97% (State 77% and District 84%) 
The number of students who achieved "Advanced" on the STAAR test in English and U.S. History was higher than the state average:
 "Advanced" English II - 20% (State 17% and District 27%)
 "Advanced" U.S. History - 49% (State 22% and District 31%)

Athletics
The Hebron Hawks compete in Volleyball (Girls), Cross Country (Girls/Boys), Basketball (Girls/Boys), Wrestling (Girls/Boys), Swimming and Diving (Girls/Boys), Soccer (Girls/Boys), Golf (Girls/Boys), Tennis (Girls/Boys/Team), Track (Girls/Boys), Football,  Baseball, and Softball.

State Titles
Girls Cross Country
2014 (6A)
Football
2005 (4A/D2)
Girls Soccer
2014 (5A)
Volleyball
2004 (4A), 2010 (5A), 2015 (6A), 2016 (6A), 2017 (6A)

Extracurricular activities

Hebron is recognized for its accomplished marching band. The band is a consistent UIL State Marching competition medalist and Bands of America finalist. The band finished in 3rd place overall at both the 2015 and 2019 Bands of America Grand National Championships, and received the Finals caption award for “Outstanding Music Performance” both times. Additionally, in the 2015 season, the band's Bands of America Grand Nationals semifinals performance score broke the contemporary record for the highest score awarded in the competition’s history, totaling 97.85 of 100 points. Hebron's record stood until November 2021, at which point it was passed by Broken Arrow High School. In 2021, the band received the title of 2021 UIL 6A State Marching Band Champion. The band performed in the 2022 Rose Parade in Pasadena, California.

The Hebron Speech and Debate team is accomplished as well, qualifying CX Teams and Individual Participants in Lincoln-Douglas Debate for the Texas Forensic Association State tournament. Hebron has qualified three teams to the Tournament of Champions for policy debate: Hebron KN (2017-2018), Hebron BS (2019-2020), and Hebron KP (2019-2020). 

In 2012, the school newspaper The Hawk Eye received a Silver Crown, a prestigious award given by the Columbia Scholastic Press Association.

Notable alumni

 Jamal Adams, football player, Seattle Seahawks
 Cherami Leigh, actress
 Tanner Marsh, football player
 Sam Freeman, pitcher
 Deatrich Wise Jr., football player, New England Patriots
 Daniel Wise, football player, Washington Commanders
Stansly Maponga, football player, Orlando Guardians
Shelton Johnson, football player
 Jesse Iwuji, motorsports driver
 Clayton Tune, football player
 Verone McKinley III, football player, Miami Dolphins

Achievements
 Drill team
 National Champions MA National Dance Championships in 2006, 2007.
 National Champions HTE National Dance Championships in 2009, 2010.
 National Champions ADTS National Dance Championships in 2011.
Cheerleading
NCA High School National Champions Large Co-Ed division 2002
Choir
TMEA Invited Performing Choir: 2015
SWACDA Invited Performing Choir: 2017 
Marching Band
BOA Regional Finalist: 2001 (10th Place), 2004 (7th), 2006 (7th), 2008 (3rd), 2009 (3rd), 2010 (7th), 2011 (10th), 2012 (4th), 2013 (DFW Regional Champion), 2014 (Denton Regional Champion), 2015 (2nd), 2016 (3rd), 2017 (Southlake Regional Champion), 2018 (2nd), 2019 (2nd), 2021 (2nd), 2022 (1st, 6A)
BOA Super Regional Finalist: 2004 (14th Place), 2005 (14th), 2006 (9th), 2007 (13th), 2008 (8th), 2009 (9th), 2010 (8th), 2012 (7th), 2013 (2nd), 2014 (6th), 2015 (4th), 2016 (5th), 2017 (2nd), 2018 (3rd), 2019 (5th), 2021 (1st), 2022 (1st, 6A)
BOA Grand Nationals Finalist: 2015 (3rd Place, Outstanding Music Caption), 2019 (3rd place, Outstanding Music Caption, Rose Parade invitation)
UIL Area: 2003 (2nd Place, 4A), 2005 (4th, 4A), 2006 (5th, 5A), 2008 (5th, 5A), 2010, 2012, 2014, 2016, 2018 (2nd, 6A), 2020 (3rd, 6A), 2021 (2nd, 6A), 2022 (1st, 6A)
UIL State Finalist: 2008 (10th Place, 5A), 2010 (6th, 5A), 2012 (2nd, 5A), 2014 (2nd, 6A), 2016 (2nd, 6A), 2018 (4th, 6A), 2020 (2nd, 6A), 2021 (1st, 6A), 2022 (2nd, 6A)
Theatre
UIL One Act Play State Competition 2017- 2nd Runner Up
Orchestra
TMEA All-State Honor Orchestra Finalist 2017 - 9th Place

References

External links
Lewisville School District Website
Hebron High School Website
Hebron Hawk Football Website
Hebron Hawk Basketball Website
Hebron Hawk Lacrosse Website
Hebron Hawk Golf Website
Hebron Band Website

Lewisville Independent School District high schools
Educational institutions established in 1999
1999 establishments in Texas
Schools in Carrollton, Texas